Shoot Low Sheriff is a Western Swing band based in Dallas, Texas. Formed in 2008, the 7-piece group consists of vocalist Erik Swanson (formerly of Cowboys & Indians and the Texas Gypsies), Brandon Lusk (trumpet), Dustin Ballard (fiddle/electric mandolin), Jessica Munn (guitar), Larry Reed (bass), Geoff Vinton (drums), and Wayne Glasson, current pianist for the Texas Playboys and Red Steagall.

The band is heavily influenced by western swing pioneers Bob Wills and Milton Brown, and play a combination of swing standards and original compositions, as well as New Orleans jazz, ragtime and jump blues.

In 2009, their song "Old Alton Rag" was featured in a television commercial for Jack Daniels and in 2012, the band was named "Western Swing Group of the Year" by the Academy of Western Artists.

Discography 
The Mockingbird Sessions (2010)
Wanted in Texas (2012)

External links 
Official Band Website
Dallas Observer Album Review

Musical groups established in 2008
Western swing musical groups
Musical groups from Dallas